Cosmi may refer to:

 Cosmi Corporation, a U.S. computer software company
 Cosmi, Americo & Figlio, an Italian gun manufacturer
 Sam Cosmi (born 1999), American football player